The Short 330 (also SD3-30) is a small turboprop transport aircraft produced by Short Brothers. It seats up to 30 people and was relatively inexpensive and had low maintenance costs at the time of its introduction in 1976. The 330 was based on the SC.7 Skyvan.

Development
The Short 330 was developed by Short Brothers of Belfast from Short's earlier Short Skyvan STOL utility transport. The 330 had a longer wingspan and fuselage than the Skyvan, while retaining the Skyvan's square-shaped fuselage cross section, allowing it to carry up to 30 passengers while retaining good short field characteristics. The first prototype of the 330 flew on 22 August 1974.

The Short 330 is unusual in having all of its fuel contained in tanks located directly above the ceiling of the passenger cabin. There are two separate cockpit doors for pilot and co-pilot for access from inside the cabin.

While Short concentrated on producing airliners, the design also spawned two freight versions. The first of these, the Short 330-UTT (standing for Utility Tactical Transport), was a military transport version fitted with a strengthened cabin floor and paratroop doors, which was sold in small numbers, primarily to Thailand, which purchased four. The Short Sherpa was a freighter fitted with a full-width rear cargo door/ramp. This version first flew on 23 December 1982, with the first order, for 18 aircraft, being placed by the United States Air Force (USAF) in March 1983, for the European Distribution System Aircraft (EDSA) role, to fly spare parts between USAF bases within Europe. Subsequently, a further 16 were ordered as C-23B Sherpas.

Operational history

The basic Short 330 was a passenger aircraft intended as a short-range regional and commuter airliner, and had been designed to take advantage of US regulations which allowed commuter airlines to use aircraft carrying up to 30 passengers, thereby replacing smaller types such as the Beechcraft Model 99 and the de Havilland Canada DHC-6 Twin Otter. The Short 330 entered service with Time Air (a Canadian airline) in 1976. Despite its somewhat portly looks (one regional airline affectionately dubbed it the "Shed" ), it soon proved to be an inexpensive and reliable 30-seat airliner.

The 330 was somewhat slower than most of its pressurised competition, but it built up a reputation as a comfortable, quiet and rugged airliner. The quiet running of the Pratt & Whitney PT6A-45R was largely due to an efficient reduction gearbox. The cabin was the result of a collaboration with Boeing engineers who modelled the interior space, fittings and decor after larger airliners. The use of a sturdy structure complete with the traditional Short braced-wing-and-boxy-fuselage configuration also led to an ease of maintenance and serviceability.

Production ended in 1992 with a total of 141 being built (including freighter and military versions). As of 1998, approximately 35 were still in service. The 330's design was refined and heavily modified, resulting in the Short 360.

Variants
 330-100 was the original production model with Pratt & Whitney Canada PT6A-45A and -45B turboprop engines.
 330-200 included minor improvements and more powerful PT6A-45R engine.
 330-UTT was the Utility Tactical Transport version of the 330-200, with a strengthened cabin floor and inward-opening paratroop doors.
 Sherpa was a freighter version of the 330-200 with a full width rear cargo ramp.
 C-23 Sherpa A, and B variants are military configured Short Sherpas. (NB The C-23B+ is a conversion of 28 Short 360 airframes.)

Operators

Civilian
The aircraft is popular with air charters, small feeder airlines, and air freight companies.

Military
 
 United States Air Force (C-23)
 United States Army (C-23)

Former

 Tanzanian Air Force 
 
 Royal Thai Army
 Royal Thai Police
 
 United Arab Emirates Air Force

Venezuelan Air Force

Accidents and incidents
 the aircraft type has suffered three fatal accidents in civilian use:
 3 August 1989: an Olympic Aviation Short 330, operating as Olympic Aviation Flight 545, crashed on a hillside in Samos island, Greece, while attempting a landing approach in thick fog. All 3 crew members and 31 passengers were killed.
25 May 2000: a Streamline Aviation Short 330 G-SSWN was hit by a departing aircraft (F-GHED, an MD-83 of Air Liberte) when it entered an active runway at Paris-Charles de Gaulle Airport. The wingtip of the departing plane slashed through the Short's cockpit and killed one of its pilots.
5 May 2017: a Short 330 cargo plane owned by Air Cargo Carriers and operated as Air Cargo Carriers Flight 1260 crashed after suffering a hard landing at Yeager Airport in Charleston, West Virginia.  Early reports stated that the left wing made contact with the surface of the runway, and separated from the fuselage, causing the aircraft to cartwheel off the runway and down a heavily wooded hillside. Both pilots died in the crash.

In addition to these three accidents there have been at least 16 hull-loss occurrences, i.e. non-fatal accidents where the plane has been damaged beyond repair.

Aircraft on display 
G-BDBS msn SH3001 (production prototype) is on display within the Ulster Aviation Society's Heritage Collection of aircraft at Maze Long Kesh in Lisburn, Northern Ireland.

G-OGIL msn SH3068 is on display at the North East Land, Sea and Air Museum in Sunderland, United Kingdom.

Specifications (330-200)

See also

References

Notes

Bibliography

 Barnes C.H. and James Derek N. Shorts Aircraft since 1900. London: Putnam, 1989. .
 Donald, David, ed. The Encyclopedia of Civil Aircraft. London: Aurum, 1999. .
 Frawley, Gerard. The International Directory of Civil Aircraft, 2003/2004. London: Aerospace Publications Pty Ltd., 2003. .
 Smith, P.R. Shorts 330 and 360 (Air Portfolios 2) London: Jane's Publishing Company Limited, 1986. .
 Taylor, John W.R., ed. Jane's All the World's Aircraft, 1988–1989. London: Jane's Information Group, 1988. .

External links

 Short 330 page on Airliners.net
 C-23 page on Global Security.org

1970s British airliners
330
High-wing aircraft
Twin-turboprop tractor aircraft
Aircraft first flown in 1974
Twin-tail aircraft